This is a list of notable events in Latin music (i.e., music from the Spanish- and Portuguese-speaking areas Latin America, Latin Europe, and the United States) that took place in 2001.

Events 
August 20The Latin Recording Academy moves the upcoming Latin Grammy Awards from Miami to Los Angeles following protests by Cuban exiles over the Latin Recording Academy's decision to allow musicians from Cuba to perform on award ceremony.
September 11Following the terrorist attacks in the United States, the 2nd Annual Latin Grammy Awards ceremony, which was planned to air later that day, is promptly canceled and the ceremony was not rescheduled due to logistical problems. The cancellation of the award ceremony cost the organizers an estimated two million dollars in losses.
October 30The 2nd Annual Latin Grammy Awards are held in a press conference at the Conga Room in Los Angeles.
Alejandro Sanz wins the Latin Grammy Awards for Song of the Year and Record of the Year for "El Alma al Aire" and Album of the Year for the album of the same name.
Juanes wins the Latin Grammy Award for Best New Artist.
Julio Iglesias is honored as the Latin Recording Academy Person of the Year.
December 9The Hispanos Unidos Por New York benefit concert is held at the Madison Square Garden featuring Latin acts such as Marc Anthony, Carlos Vives, Alejandro Fernández, Thalía, Juan Luis Guerra, and José José. The concert was held as a relief efforts to both the victims of the September 11 attacks as well as the crash of American Airlines Flight 587.

Bands formed

Bands reformed

Bands disbanded

Bands on hiatus

Number-ones albums and singles by country 
List of number-one albums of 2001 (Spain)
List of number-one singles of 2001 (Spain)
List of number-one Billboard Top Latin Albums of 2001
List of number-one Billboard Hot Latin Tracks of 2001

Awards 
2001 Latin Grammy Awards
2001 Premio Lo Nuestro
2001 Billboard Latin Music Awards
2001 Tejano Music Awards

Albums released

First quarter

January

February

March

Second quarter

April

May

June

Third quarter

July

August

September

Fourth quarter

October

November

December

Unknown

Best-selling records

Best-selling albums
The following is a list of the top 10 best-selling Latin albums in the United States in 2001, according to Billboard.

Best-performing songs
The following is a list of the top 10 best-performing Latin songs in the United States in 2001, according to Billboard.

Births 
December 7Quevedo, Spanish rapper

Deaths

References 

 
Latin music by year